Justice Jennings may refer to:

Newell Jennings (1883–1965), associate justice of the Connecticut Supreme Court
Renz L. Jennings (1899–1983), associate justice of the Arizona Supreme Court